Levpa is a dispersed settlement in the hills to the east of Kanal in the Littoral region of Slovenia. It lies on the northwest part of the Banjšice Plateau and is made up of several smaller settlements: Bizjaki, Dolenja Levpa, Gorenja Levpa, Hoje, Mešnjak, Košenija, Robi, Sukavec, Testeni, and Zavrh.

The parish church in the settlement is dedicated to Saint Stephen and belongs to the Diocese of Koper.

References

External links
Levpa on Geopedia
Levpa on the Kanal Tourist Information site

Populated places in the Municipality of Kanal